The Royal African Company (RAC) was an English mercantile (trading) company set up in 1660 by the royal Stuart family and City of London merchants to trade along the west coast of Africa. It was led by the Duke of York, who was the brother of King Charles II and in 1685, York took the throne as James II.

It was established after Charles II gained the English throne in the Restoration of 1660. While its original purpose was to exploit the gold fields up the Gambia River, which were identified by Prince Rupert during the Interregnum, it soon developed and led a brutal and sustained slave trade. It also extracted other commodities, mainly from the Gold Coast. After becoming insolvent in 1708, it survived in a state of much reduced activity until 1752 when its assets were transferred to the new African Company of Merchants, which lasted until 1821.

History

Background
In the 17th century the settlements on the west coast of Africa, though they had an important trade of their own in gold and ivory, existed chiefly for the supply of slaves to the West Indies and America. On the west coast the Europeans lived in fortified factories (trading posts) but had no sovereignty over the land or its natives. The coastal tribes acted as intermediaries between them and the slave-hunters of the interior. There was little incentive for European men to explore up the rivers, and few of them did so. The atmosphere might have been one of quiet routine had there not been acute rivalries between the European powers; especially the Dutch, who made use of native allies against their rivals. Before the Restoration, the Dutch had been the main suppliers of slaves to the English West Indian plantations, but it was part of the policy of the English Navigation Acts to oust them from this lucrative trade.

Foundation and early years

Originally known as the Company of Royal Adventurers Trading into Africa, by its charter issued in 1660 it was granted a monopoly over English trade along the west coast of Africa, with the principal objective being the search for gold. In 1663, a new charter was obtained which also mentioned the trade in slaves. This was the third English African Company, but it made a fresh start in the slave trade and there was only one factory of importance for it to take over from the East India Company, which had leased it as a calling-place on the sea-route round the Cape. This was Cormantin, a few miles east of the Dutch station of Cape Coast Castle, now in Ghana. The 1663 charter prohibits others to trade in "redwood, elephants' teeth, negroes, slaves, hides, wax, guinea grains, or other commodities of those countries".  In 1663, as a prelude to the Dutch war, Captain Holmes's expedition captured or destroyed all the Dutch settlements on the coast, and in 1664, Fort James was founded on an island about twenty miles up the Gambia river, as a new centre for English trade and power. This, however, was only the beginning of a series of captures and recaptures. In the same year, de Ruyter won back all the Dutch forts except Cape Coast Castle and also took Cormantin. In 1667, the Treaty of Breda confirmed Cape Coast Castle to the English.

Forts served as staging and trading stations, and the company was responsible for seizing any English ships that attempted to operate in violation of its monopoly (known as interlopers). In the "prize court", the King received half of the proceeds and the company half from the seizure of these interlopers.

The company fell heavily into debt in 1667, during the Second Anglo-Dutch War. For several years after that, the company maintained some desultory trade, including licensing single-trip private traders, but its biggest effort was the creation in 1668 of the Gambia Adventurers. This new company was separately subscribed and granted a ten-year licence for African trade north of the Bight of Benin with effect from 1 January 1669. At the end of 1678, the licence to the Gambia Adventurers expired and its Gambian trade was merged into the company.

The African Company was ruined by its losses and surrendered its charter in 1672, to be followed by the still more ambitious Royal African Company of England. Its new charter was broader than the old one and included the right to set up forts and factories, maintain troops, and exercise martial law in West Africa, in pursuit of trade in gold, silver and Bantu African slaves. Until 1687, the company was very prosperous. It set up six forts on the Gold Coast, and another post at Ouidah, farther east on the Slave Coast, which became its principal centre for trade. Cape Coast Castle was strengthened and rose to be second in importance only to the Dutch factory at Elmina. Anglo-Dutch rivalry was, however, henceforward unimportant in the region and the Dutch were not strong enough to take aggressive measures here in the Third Anglo-Dutch War.

Slave trade
In the 1680s, the company was transporting about 5,000 enslaved people a year to markets primarily in the Caribbean across the Atlantic. Many were branded with the letters "DoY", for its Governor, the Duke of York, who succeeded his brother on the throne in 1685, becoming King James II. Other slaves were branded with the company's initials, RAC, on their chests. Historian William Pettigrew has stated that this company "shipped more enslaved African women, men and children to the Americas than any other single institution during the entire period of the transatlantic slave trade", and that investors in the company were fully aware of its activities and intended to profit from this exploitation.

Between 1672 and 1731, the Royal African Company transported 187,697 enslaved people on company-owned ships (653 voyages) to English colonies in the Americas. Of those transported, 38,497 enslaved people died en route.  The predecessor "Company of Royal Adventurers" (1662 - 1672) transported 26,925 enslaved people on company-owned ships (104 voyages), of whom 6,620 died during the passage.

Later activities and insolvency
From 1694 to 1700, the company was a major participant in the Komenda Wars in the port city Komenda in the Eguafo Kingdom in modern-day Ghana. The company allied with a merchant prince named John Cabess and various neighbouring African kingdoms to depose the king of Eguafo and establish a permanent fort and factory in Komenda. The English took two French forts and lost them again, after which the French destroyed Fort James. The place appears to have been soon regained and in the War of Spanish Succession to have been twice retaken by the French. In the treaty of Utrecht it remained English. The French wars caused considerable losses to the company.

In 1689, the company acknowledged that it had lost its monopoly with the end of royal power in the Glorious Revolution, and it ceased issuing letters of marque. Edward Colston transferred a large segment of his original shareholding to William III at the beginning of 1689, securing the new regime's favour. To maintain the company and its infrastructure and end its monopoly, parliament passed the Trade with Africa Act 1697 (9 Will. 3 c. 26). Among other provisions, the Act opened the African trade to all English merchants who paid a ten per cent levy to the company on all goods exported from Africa.

The company was unable to withstand competition on the terms imposed by the Act and in 1708 became insolvent, surviving until 1750 in a state of much reduced activity. In 1709 Charles Davenant published Reflections upon the Constitution and Management of Trade to Africa, in which he "reverted to his normal attitude of suspicion and outright hostility towards the Dutch." This pamphlet advocated renewing the Royal African Company's monopoly on slave trade on the basis that the Dutch competition "necessitated the maintenance of forts, which only a joint-stock company could afford."

The company continued purchasing and transporting slaves until 1731, when it abandoned slaving in favour of ivory and gold dust.

From 1668 to 1722, the Royal African Company provided gold to the English Mint. Coins made with such gold are designed with an elephant below the bust of the king and/or queen. This gold also gave the coinage its name, the guinea.

Members and officials
At its incorporation, the constitution of the company specified a Governor, Sub Governor, Deputy Governor and 24 Assistants. The Assistants (also called Members of the Court of Assistants) can be considered equivalent to a modern-day board of directors.
 James Stuart, Duke of York, the future King James II – Governor of the company from 1660 to 1688; and its largest shareholder
Edward Colston (1636–1721), merchant, philanthropist, and Member of Parliament, was a shareholder in the Royal African Company from 1680 to 1692; from 1689 to 1690 he was its Deputy Governor, a senior executive position, the basis on which he is described as a slave trader.
Charles Hayes (1678–1760), mathematician and chronologer, was sub-governor of the Royal African Company in 1752, when it was dissolved.
Malachy Postlethwayt, director and propagandist of the company.

List of notable investors and officials
(For a full list of officials and investors in 1672, when the new charter was granted, see: List of Officials and Shareholders in the Royal African Company, 1672)

 Charles II of England
 Sir Edmund Andros
 Sir John Banks
 Benjamin Bathurst, Deputy Governor of the Leeward Islands
 Henry Bennet, 1st Earl of Arlington
 George Villiers, 2nd Duke of Buckingham
 Sir Josiah Child
 Sir Robert Clayton
 Sir George Carteret
 Sir Peter Colleton
 Anthony Ashley Cooper, 1st Earl of Shaftesbury
 Earl of Craven
 Lawrence Du Puy
 Sir Samuel Dashwood
 Ferdinand Gorges grandson of Ferdinando Gorges
 Francis, Lord Hawley
 George Frideric Handel 
 Sir Jeffrey Jeffreys, Commander of affairs of Leeward Isles in England 1690 – c. 1696, Assistant to the Royal African Company 1684–1686, 1692–1698
 Sir John Lawrence
 John Locke
 Sir John Moore
 Samuel Pepys
 James Phipps of Cape Coast Castle
 Thomas Povey
 Sir William Prichard
 Sir Gabriel Roberts
 Prince Rupert
 Tobias Rustat
 Robert Aske
 Sir John Shaw, 1st Baronet
 Sir Robert Vyner, 1st Baronet
 Matthew Wren

Dissolution 

The Royal African Company was dissolved by the African Company Act 1750, with its assets being transferred to the African Company of Merchants. These principally consisted of nine trading posts on the Gold Coast known as factories: Fort Anomabo, Fort James, Fort Sekondi, Fort Winneba, Fort Apollonia, Fort Tantumquery, Fort Metal Cross, Fort Komenda and Cape Coast Castle, the last of which was the administrative centre.

See also

 List of trading companies

Notes

Further reading

 Davies, Kenneth Gordon. The Royal African Company. Routledge/Thoemmes Press, 1999. 
 Pettigrew, William A. Freedom's Debt: The Royal African Company and the Politics of the Atlantic Slave Trade, 1672–1752. Chapel Hill, NC: University of North Carolina Press, 2014.

External links

British slave trade
British colonisation in Africa
Chartered companies
History of West Africa
Defunct companies of England
History of Ghana
Economic history of Great Britain
History of Senegal
Trading companies of England
1660 establishments in England
Companies established in 1660
British companies disestablished in 1752
17th century in Africa
18th century in Africa
Defunct companies of the United Kingdom
Economy of Stuart England
Trading companies established in the 17th century
British slave traders